Bagha Qaghan was the seventh ruler (587–589) of the Göktürks. He may have been
the 'great kaghan' that was killed with an arrow by Persian commander Bahrām Chobin during the First Perso-Turkic War. 
He is given as Chǔluóhóu (处罗侯) in Chinese records, and as Šāwa, Sāva, or Sāba in Sasanian-based sources.  He was hunchback.

References

Sources 
 
 
 
 
 
 

 

Göktürk khagans
Monarchs killed in action
589 deaths
Deaths by arrow wounds
6th-century monarchs in Asia
Year of birth unknown
Ashina house of the Turkic Empire
Royalty and nobility with disabilities